Dewan Mushtaq Ahmed (born September 23, 1949 at Mandi Bahauddin) is a Pakistani politician. He received his Intermediate from Mandi Bahauddin, and bachelors from forman christen college and is the son of Dewan Muhammad Ishaq. He is an agriculturist, who also have served as Chairman, Municipal Committee of Mandi Bahauddin for six years. He was elected as a MPA Member of the Provincial Assembly to the Provincial Assembly of the Punjab in 1997 till 1999. 
After the General Musharraf's military coup in 1999, he was one of the few PML-N Parliamentarians who chose to remain loyal with his party (PML-N) despite lucrative offers from PML-Q (General Musharraf’s party) and raised his voice against the military coup.

External links
http://pap.gov.pk/uploads/previous_members/1997-2001/dist15.htm

1958 births
Living people